Julian Belmont Woodson (January 4, 1872 – July 7, 1963) was an American Democratic politician who served as a member of the Virginia Senate, representing the state's 19th district from 1920 to 1924 and its 4th district from 1924 to 1940.

References

External links
 
 

1872 births
1963 deaths
Democratic Party Virginia state senators
Washington University in St. Louis alumni
People from Nelson County, Virginia
20th-century American politicians